This list comprises all players who have participated in at least one league match for Minnesota Thunder from the time the USL began keeping archived records in 2003, until the team's last competitive season in 2008. Players who were on the roster but never played a first team game are not listed; players who appeared for the team in other competitions (US Open Cup, CONCACAF Champions League, etc.) but never actually made an USL appearance are noted at the bottom of the page where appropriate.

A "†" denotes players who only appeared in a single match.

A
 Mark Abboud
 Ubusuku Abukusumo
 Charles Adair
 Jay Alberts
 Kyle Altman
 Daniel Alvarez
 Terry Alvino
 Kevin Anderson
 Andres Arango

B
 Kalin Bankov
 Andrew Barron
 Jeremiah Bass
 Niels Bo Daugaard
 Brett Branan
 Dustin Branan
 Chris Brisson
 Sean Brown
 Christopher Brunt

C
 David Castellanos
 Joenal Castma †
 Chris Clements
 Rich Costanzo
 John Coughlin
 Brian Cvilikas

D
 Alejandro De La Mora
 Michael Dello-Russo
 Stephen deRoux
 Alejandro Diaz-Grova
 Francis Doe
 Chad Dombrowski
 Tighe Dombrowski
 Rod Dyachenko

E
 Alfredo Esteves
 Adam Eyre

F
 Brian Farber
 Jakob Fenger-Larsen
 Marco Ferruzzi
 Kevin Friedland
 Tim Foster

G
 Craig Gaunt
 Mike Gentile
 Leo Gibson
 Luchi Gonzalez
 Tyrone Gordon
 Chris Gores
 Andrei Gotsmanov †
 Sasha Gotsmanov
 Sergey Gotsmanov
 Dan Gramenz
 Jonathan Greenfield

H
 Jonathon Hargis
 Rodrigo Hidalgo
 Matt Holmes
 Alvin Hudson

J
 Brent Jacquette
 Nate Jaqua
 Julius James
 Freddy Juarez

K
 Brian Kallman
 Youssouf Kanté
 Zafer Kılıçkan
 Quavas Kirk
 Nathan Knox

L
 Luis Labastida
 Gerard Lagos
 Manny Lagos
 Kiki Lara
 Aaron Leventhal
 Hugo Llamas
 Jon Lowery
 Andy Lee
 Josh Lynk

M
 Amos Magee
 Craig Mallace
 Donny Mark
 Alen Marcina
 Thiago Martins
 Jeffrey Matteo
 Terry McNelis
 Johnny Menyongar
 Kirk Miller
 Stoian Mladenov
 Frederico Moojen
 Paul Moran
 Marshall Morehead
 Geoffrey Myers

N
 Paul Nowak

O
 Dan O'Brien
 Dayton O'Brien
 Lawrence Olum
 Keisuke Ota
 Eric Otto

P
 Carlos Parra
 Nick Pasquarello
 Aaron Paye
 Brian Pederson
 Charles Peszneker
 Andrew Peterson
 Nicolas Platter
 Orrett Prendergast
 Tom Presthus *
 James Prosser

R
 C. W. Raines
 Tenkir Reta
 Evan Richardson
 Brian Roberts
 Neill Roberts

S
 Ricardo Sánchez
 Leonel Saint-Preux
 Tony Sanneh
 Mike Saunders
 Matt Schmidt
 Paul Schneider
 Mark Schulte
 Dionysius Sebwe
 Steve Shak
 Garfield Shaw
 Lencho Skibba
 Derek Smith
 Darren Spicer
 Constantin Stănici
 John Swallen
 Bradley Swenby

Petros Tensae
 Melvin Tarley
 Kevin Taylor
 Godfrey Tenoff
 Marco Terminesi
 Johnny Torres
 Ansu Toure

U
 Siniša Ubiparipović

V
 Ronald Valderrama
 Matt Van Oekel †
 Tony Vogtlin
 Christopher Vorenkamp

W
 Joe Warren
 Marcus Watson †
 Dale Weiler
 Greg Wheaton
 Jason Willan
 Michael Wilson
 Nate Winkel
 Brian Winters

Z
 Morgan Zeba
 Kyle Zenoni

Sources

Minnesota Thunder
 
Association football player non-biographical articles